KCCY-FM (96.9 MHz, "Y96.9") is a radio station broadcasting a country format. Licensed to Pueblo, Colorado, United States, it serves the Colorado Springs area. The station is currently owned by iHeartMedia, Inc.

KCCY was originally owned by McCoy Broadcasting, with its offices and studio located in Pueblo. In 2001, the station was acquired by Clear Channel Communications. Its offices and studios were then moved to Colorado Springs.

History
Original call letters for this facility were KDJQ when the station signed on in 1975 as an automated Top 40 station on 97.9. The station was assigned the call letters KCSJ-FM on October 11, 1978. On January 25, 1979, the station changed its call sign to KCCY; the "-FM" suffix was added on April 1, 2012. In 1993, the station moved from its original 97.9 FM frequency to 96.9 in order to make room for KKFM, which moved to 98.1.

Former White House press secretary now Fox News Channel personality Dana Perino worked there on the 2 a.m. to 6 a.m. shift while attending college.

References

External links

CCY-FM
Radio stations established in 1975
1975 establishments in Colorado
IHeartMedia radio stations
Country radio stations in the United States